The 2001 NBDL Supplemental Draft was a supplemental draft for the newly formed National Basketball Association Development League (abbreviated NBDL from 2001 through 2004, then NBADL since 2005). It was held on November 3, 2001, before the league's inaugural 2001–02 season, and took place two days after the 2001 NBDL Draft. The supplemental draft was a one-time occurrence designed to fill out the league's rosters and to ensure competitive play. In this draft, all eight of the league's charter teams took turns selecting available recent college graduates, semi-professional and/or professional players. The draft consisted of four rounds of eight selections each, but there were five instances of a team passing on their draft selection. In all, 27 players were drafted out of 32 possible selections; the Huntsville Flight and Fayetteville Patriots passed on two players apiece, while the Columbus Riverdragons passed on one.

Lorenzo Coleman, a  center who graduated from Tennessee Tech in 1998, was the first overall selection. Nearly half (11) of the 27 players selected in the supplemental draft were also chosen in an NBA Draft. Among them, Kaniel Dickens later became an NBA Development League All-Star after the annual contest began in 2007. No other players in the NBDL Supplemental Draft were ever selected as D-League All-Stars. The oldest player taken in the 2001 NBDL Supplemental Draft was Dwayne Schintzius, who had graduated from Florida in 1990 and was 33 years old on draft day. Schintzius had spent the 1990s playing in the NBA for six different teams before ending up in the D-League. The D-League's first-season MVP was Ansu Sesay, who had been selected 14th overall in the Supplemental Draft by the Greenville Groove.

There were two schools that had two different players drafted. Florida's Schintzius and Brent Wright were selected 18th and 22nd overall, respectively, while Charlotte had Kelvin Price and Galen Young go 7th and 19th overall, respectively.

Key

Draft

References
General

Specific

Draft, Supplemental
NBA G League draft
National Basketball Association lists
NBA Development League draft